The 2013 Minnesota Golden Gophers football team represented the University of Minnesota in the 2013 NCAA Division I FBS football season. They were led by third-year head coach Jerry Kill and played their home games at TCF Bank Stadium. They were a member of the Legends Division of the Big Ten Conference.

Before the season
The Gophers had their first, full intrasquad scrimmage during the Spring Game under Kill's tenure; his previous two Spring Games had been limited in scope. The game attracted 8,400 fans, the largest attendance for a Gophers Spring Game since Lou Holtz coached the team in the mid-1980s.

Schedule

Source: Schedule

Rankings

Roster

Game summaries

UNLV

New Mexico State

Western Illinois

San Jose State

Iowa

Michigan

Northwestern

Nebraska

The game was Minnesota's first win against Nebraska since a 26–14 victory on September 24, 1960.

Indiana

Penn State

Wisconsin

Michigan State

Syracuse (Texas Bowl)

Players Drafted into the NFL

References

External links

Minnesota
Minnesota Golden Gophers football seasons
Minnesota Golden Gophers football